Abraham Piper is a serial entrepreneur and artist living in Minneapolis. He is the son of Reformed preacher and writer John Piper. 

At age 19 he was excommunicated from his father's church after he rejected the faith. He was restored to membership four years later, but later rejected the faith again. 

He started the popular news aggregator 22 Words in 2008. He founded the media company Brainjolt in 2014, which owns 22 Words and several other internet companies. In 2017, he told CNBC Brainjolt was expected to have $30 million in annual revenue. In 2019, he started a premium jigsaw puzzle company called Blue Kazoo. 

In November 2020, he began posting TikTok videos, which included posts critical of his Evangelical upbringing. His TikTok following was 1.7 million in December 2021.

References

External links
 
 TikTok

Year of birth missing (living people)
Businesspeople from Minneapolis
Artists from Minneapolis
American former Christians
Critics of Christianity
American TikTokers
Living people
People excommunicated by Baptist churches